Paul Topinard (4 November 1830, L'Isle-Adam Parmain, Val-d'Oise – 20 December 1911) was a French physician and anthropologist who was a student of Paul Broca and whose views influenced the methodology adopted by Herbert Hope Risley in his ethnographic surveys of the people of India. He became director of the École d'Anthropologie and secretary-general of the Société d'Anthropologie de Paris, both in succession to Broca. He was elected as a member to the American Philosophical Society in 1886.

Biography

Paul Topinard's specialization was physical anthropology. His opinions were polygenist but he was less rigid than Broca. He nonetheless frequently referred to Broca as his "master", and according to John Carson was "committed to the superiority of white male Europeans". Patrick Brantlinger says that 

In a manner similar to Samuel George Morton, the anthropologist of the United States, Topinard conducted experiments intended to test theories that cranial capacity was a marker of ethnicity, with European capacities being the largest and Australian Aborigines the smallest. He calculated the capacity of various skulls by pouring substances into them and then noting the volume consumed, on the assumption that a larger space for a brain equated to a more developed intellect. He also believed that such measurements could be tracked through the evolution of the human species and that a larger cranial capacity was therefore related to a greater degree of civilisation. Charles Loring Brace has recently studied skulls used originally by Topinard in his experiments and believes that there is a fundamental flaw in the theory because the Congolese and West African examples represented people who were physically much smaller overall.

By 1891 Topinard was questioning the assumptions used to assess relative racial worth in his earlier works. He noted in his L'Homme dans la nature

Publications
Quelques aperçus sur la chirurgie anglaise (1860)

L'Homme dans la nature (1891)
Science et foi. L'anthropologie et la science sociale (1900)

See also
James Bonwick, who studied with Topinard in Paris.
Scientific racism

References
Citations

Bibliography

External links

 

1830 births
1911 deaths
People from Val-d'Oise
French anthropologists
Physical anthropologists
19th-century French writers
Burials at Père Lachaise Cemetery
French male writers
19th-century French male writers
Members of the American Philosophical Society